Kang Min-jae (born 6 August 1985 in Seoul) is a South Korean racing driver. He tested F3 car with the German team Mücke Motorsport in 2011 Hockenheimring.

Racing career
He started his racing career in 2001. He won the kartvil kart challenge championship in 2004. He certificated Suzuka Circuit Racing School - Formula Basic Course in 2004 and Formula Toyota Racing School (FTRS) in 2006, Japan. From 2007 to 2009, he fulfilled military duty. In 2011, he won the Johnnie Walker Keep Walking Fund 2011 in Korea  and prepared F3 test drive in October, German.

On 12 December 2011, his documentary about F3 test drive aired by Korean broadcast station, MBC.

References

External links
 Official website
 Career statistics from Database of Korea Automobile Racing Association

1985 births
Living people
Sportspeople from Seoul
South Korean racing drivers